Circus is the second album of J-pop duo FictionJunction Yuuka. It was released on July 4, 2007.

This album includes their last four singles and their b-sides (with the exception of "Yakusoku"), the previously Tsubasa Chronicle Future Soundscape IV exclusive "aikoi", as well as four brand-new songs. There are two versions of this album: the normal edition (with catalog number VICL-62426) and the limited edition (with catalog number VIZL-235). The limited edition includes a DVD with the PVs of Silly-Go-Round, Kōya Ruten and romanesque. The album debuted at #10 on the Oricon Album Charts.

Track listing

DVD

External links
Victor Animation Network: discography entry

References and notes

2007 albums
Victor Entertainment albums